The population of Taiwan is approximately 23.30 million as of January 2023.

Immigration of Han Chinese to the Penghu islands started as early as the 13th century, while settlement of the main island occurred from the 16th century during the Ming–Qing transition. Further immigration occurred when workers were imported from Fujian in the 17th century. According to governmental statistics, in the early 21st century, 95% to 97% of Taiwan's population are Han Chinese, while about 2.3% are Taiwanese of Austronesian ethnicity. Half the population are followers of one or a mixture of 25 recognized religions.

During the 20th century, the population of Taiwan rose more than sevenfold, from about 3 million in 1905 to more than 22 million by 2001. This high growth was caused by a combination of factors, such as very high fertility rates up to the 1960s, and low mortality rates. In addition, there was a surge in population as the Chinese Civil War ended and the Kuomintang (KMT) forces retreated, bringing an influx of 1.2 million soldiers and civilians to Taiwan in 19481949, representing less than 15% of the population at the time (who constitute approximately 10% of the population in 2004). Consequently, the population growth rate after that was very rapid, especially in the late 1940s and 1950s, with an effective annual growth rate as high as 3.68% during 19511956.

Fertility rates decreased gradually thereafter; in 1984 the rate reached the replacement level (2.1 children per woman, which is needed to replace the existing population). Fertility rates have continued to decline. In 2010, Taiwan had a population growth of less than 0.2% and a fertility rate of only 0.9, the lowest rate ever recorded in that country. The population of Taiwan peaked at 23.6 million in 2019 and has been continuously decreasing ever since.

Most Taiwanese speak Mandarin. Around 70% of the people also speak Taiwanese Hokkien and 10% speak Hakka. Japanese speakers are becoming rare as the elderly generation who lived under Japanese colonization are dying out. The Formosan languages are endangered as the indigenous peoples have become acculturated under Chinese culture.

Population 

According to February 2022 statistics from the Ministry of the Interior, the population of Taiwan was 23,319,776, 99.6% of whom live on the island of Taiwan. The remaining 0.4% live on offshore islands (Penghu, Lanyu, Green, Kinmen, and Matsu).

Taiwan is ranked the 57th most populous nation in the world.

Historical 

The number of Chinese people living on the island in 1624, prior to Dutch colonial rule, was about 25,000. During Dutch Formosa rule, between 1624 and 1662, the Dutch began to encourage large-scale Han immigration to the island for labour, mainly from the south of Fujian.

It is estimated that prior to the Kingdom of Tungning (1661), the population of Taiwan was no greater than 100,000 people, and the initial Zheng army with families and retainers that settled in Taiwan is estimated to be 30,000 at minimum. During Qing rule (1683–1895), the population of Han Chinese in Taiwan grew rapidly from 100,000 to ≈2.5 million, while the aboriginal population was estimated to be at least 200,000 by 1895. (The plains aboriginal population is estimated to have decreased by 90% over the hundred years from 1800 to 1900.)

The Japanese Colonial Government performed detailed censuses every five years starting in 1905. Statistics showed a population growth rate of about 1% to 3% per year throughout Japanese rule. In 1905, the population of Taiwan was roughly 3 million; by 1940, the population had grown to 5.87 million, and after the Second World War in 1946 it numbered 6.09 million.

Population census

Details

Date:2019/07-08

Source:  Ministry of Internal Affairs, Taiwan

Net migration rate 
During 2004 – 2010, Taiwan's migration rate was positive. On average, the annual net migration amounted to 22,000 people during that period, which is equivalent to a rate of 1.0 per 1,000 inhabitants per year.

Age structure

Sex ratio 
under 15 years: 1.06 male(s)/female
15–24 years: 1.05 male(s)/female
25–54 years: 1.00 male(s)/female
55–64 years: 0.96 male(s)/female
65 years and over: 0.84 male(s)/female
total population: 0.98 male(s)/female (2018 est)

Population growth and age structure

Demographic transition models (DTM) show how population pyramids change and go through specific stages. By looking at Taiwan's population pyramid, the country is in stage 4 of the DTM and its shape contracts but it will soon enter stage 5. In stage 5 of the DTM, death rate gradually exceeds fertility rate and a country starts to experience overall population loss. Access to good medical care increases the lifespan of a population. Knowledge of and access to contraception, along with an increase in women's participation in the workforce, cause a sharp decline in the fertility rate.

National statistics of Taiwan in 2018 indicate that there are approximately 140,000 more females than males. The birth rate (8.3 births/1,000 population) is slightly higher than the death rate (7.4 deaths/1,000 population). The total dependency ratio in Taiwan is 35.2%, which is relatively low. The low dependency ratio indicates that the dependent part of the population is less than half of the working part. Experts estimate the dependency ratio will rise to 92.9% by 2060. A rising dependency ratio and longer life expectancy will most likely require the government to support part of the elderly population as the working-age population is shrinking and thus less able to support the elderly directly.

Demographic transition and population aging

The process of population aging is primarily determined by fertility and mortality rate. The proportions of elderly people are different across countries. For example, developing countries with limited access to healthcare and contraceptives, where populations have a high fertility rate, tend to have a lower proportion of older people. Medical advancements, industrial developments, and better knowledge of sanitation, which started in the 18th century in many developed countries, have caused a decline in mortality rates and an increase in fertility rates, factors which raise the number of older people worldwide. According to the United Nations, many developed countries are in more advanced stages (4 or 5) of the demographic transition model and their number of elderly will remain high compared to less developed countries. This phenomenon is known as population aging.

According to the World Health Organization (WHO), since 1993, Taiwan has reached the threshold of an aging society. It was estimated the percentage of people over 65 was 8%. The Council for Economic Planning and Development (CEPD) has estimated that Taiwan will become an aged society as early as 2017. The CEPD estimated that the percentage of people 65 years or older will be over 20% in 2025, which means Taiwan will soon become a "super aged society". The critical factors that accelerate the speed of aging in Taiwan are high life expectancy and low fertility rate. The average life expectancy in 2014 was 80 years. The total fertility rate in 2014 was 1.1 (per 1,000 women) and dropped to 0.87 in 2022.

Ethnicity 

The ROC government reports that 95 to 97 percent of Taiwan's population is of the Han Chinese ethnicity, which includes Hoklo, Hakka, and other ethnic groups originating from mainland China. Over 2% of the population consists of indigenous Taiwanese. 21,000 Westerners live in Taiwan, accounting for 0.1% of its total population.

Indigenous Taiwanese 

The total population of recognized indigenous people in Taiwan is approximately 533,600, or approximately 2.28% of Taiwan's population. These groups primarily inhabit the eastern half of Taiwan, which consists mostly of mountainous terrain. Their population growth rate (1.2%) and population pyramid are considerably more youthful than the overall population.  Including migrant workers, the Austronesian population of Taiwan is approaching 1 million.

Note: Source data obtained from the Ministry of the Interior website (Spreadsheet data: m1-04.xls )

The Taiwanese government officially recognizes sixteen ethnic groups of Taiwanese indigenous peoples. In the early 1910s, research in the Japanese era recognized nine ethnic groups: Amis, Atayal, Bunun, Paiwan, Puyuma, Rukai, Saisiyat, Tsou, and Yami. After the 2000s, indigenous cultural revitalization movements forced the government to change its attitude towards the indigenous people of Taiwan. The Yami people were renamed to Tao. New ethnic groups were also recognized by the government, including Thao in 2001, Kavalan in 2002, Truku (Taroko) in 2004, Sakizaya in 2007, Seediq in 2008, Kanakanavu in 2014, and Saaroa in 2014. There are at least another dozen groups that are not officially recognized by the government.

Unrecognized indigenous groups may include extinct tribes (mostly Plains indigenous peoples) or communities currently classified with other groups. There are also 25,943 indigenous people who are currently not classified in any group.

Han Chinese 

The majority of Han Chinese descend from immigrants who arrived to the island prior to Japanese rule (1895–1945) and can be classified as the Hoklo and Hakka, on the basis of language and customs. As the majority of early immigrants were Hokkien speakers from Fujian who arrived starting in the 17th century, the Hoklos account for about 70% of the total population today. During Qing rule, a large number of Hoklo men took indigenous brides. Some of the plains aboriginals also adopted Chinese customs and language so as to be indistinguishable from the Han. Thus, many who categorize themselves as Han have some degree of indigenous ancestry.

A significant minority of Han Chinese are Hakka, and they constitute about 15% of the total population. The Hakkas emigrated chiefly from eastern Guangdong, speak Hakka Chinese, and originally took up residence in the hills of the indigenous border districts.

Waishengren form another significant mixed ethnic group in Taiwan.  The term refers to migrants who moved from China to Taiwan between 1945, when the ROC took control of Taiwan from the Japanese empire, and 1949 during the relocation of the ROC from mainland China to Taiwan.  Estimates vary regarding how many waishengren migrated, with most estimates ranging between 950,000 and 2 million, with 1.2 million being the most commonly cited figure in Taiwan, which would have constituted less than 15% of the population at the time (who constitute approximately 10% of the population in 2004).

Foreign residents

Languages

During Japanese rule (between 1895 and 1945), Japanese was the medium of instruction and could be fluently spoken by many of those educated during that period. Almost everyone in Taiwan born after the early 1950s can speak Mandarin, which was the official language and has been the medium of instruction in schools ever since.

Hanyu Pinyin, the official romanization system in mainland China, has also been the standard of Taiwan since 2009. A number of romanization systems are still seen in Taiwan, including Tongyong, the official romanization in Taiwan between 2002 and 2008, Wade–Giles, often found on passports, and Postal.

Other Sinitic languages can also be seen in Taiwan. The majority speak Taiwanese Hokkien, a branch of Southern Min, which had formerly been the most commonly spoken language. On Matsu Islands, the Eastern Min Fuzhou dialect is prevalent. Although people on Kinmen (Quemoy) also speak Southern Min, it is not the case in the Wuqiu Islands, for they speak a dialect of the Pu-Xian Min. The ethnic Hakka speak various Taiwanese Hakka dialects including Sixian, Hailu, Dabu, Raoping, and Zhao'an.

The most widely spoken Formosan languages today are Amis, Atayal, Bunun, and Paiwan. The other aboriginal languages that have gained official recognition are Kanakanavu, Kavalan, Puyuma, Rukai, Hla’alua, Saisiyat, Sakizaya, Seediq (closely related to Truku), Thao, Tsou, and Yami (also known as Tao).

Religion 

Article 13 of the Constitution of the Republic of China guarantees freedom of religion as a right of all its citizens. , the Republic of China government recognizes 27 religions which are registered with the Civil Affairs Department of the Ministry of the Interior (MOI).

Statistics on registered religions (2005) 

About 81.3% of the population can be considered religious believers, most of whom identify as Buddhists (35%) or Taoists (33%). Chinese folk religion is generally practised under the aegis of Taoism, while more than 10% of the population adheres to popular movements of salvation. Confucianism also is an honored school of thought and ethical codes. Christian churches have been active in Taiwan for centuries; a majority of them are Protestant, with Presbyterians playing a particularly significant role. The Republic of China's government has diplomatic relations with the Holy See, which is the only European nation to formally recognize the Republic of China and is its longest-lasting diplomatic ally, having established relations in 1942. Islam has seen a surge in recent years as a result of foreign Muslims seeking work in Taiwan, most notably from Indonesia. There is also a small group of Shinto followers under the Tenriist sect, which was introduced in the 1970s.

The table below shows official statistics on religion issued by the Department of Civil Affairs, Ministry of the Interior ("MOI"), in 2005. The Taiwanese government recognises 26 religions in Taiwan. The statistics are reported by the various religious organisations to the MOI:

The figures for The Church of Jesus Christ of Latter-day Saints are not from the MOI, rather they are based on self-reported data from LDS Newsroom. The figures for Jehovah's Witnesses are not from the MOI either, they are based on the Witnesses' own 2007 Service Year Report. In the original report, both of them were counted as part of Protestantism.

Vital statistics

Births and deaths

Current vital statistics

Fertility rate
The fertility rate in Taiwan is one of the lowest ever recorded in the world in historical times. It reached its lowest level in 2022: 0.87 children per female. In 1980, the rate was still well above replacement level (2.515), but it dropped to 1.88 in 1985, 1.81 in 1990, 1.78 in 1995, 1.68 in 2000, 1.12 in 2005, 0.90 in 2010.

Infant mortality rate 
total: 6.29 deaths/1,000 live births
male: 6.97 deaths/1,000 live births
female: 5.55 deaths/1,000 live births (2006 est.)

Life expectancy at birth 

Taiwan is ranked 39th in the world for highest life expectancy at birth.

Fertility trend

In developed countries, trends like late marriage, no marriage, and having fewer children are growing. Developed countries tend to have lower fertility rates because access to birth control and contraceptives are easier and having children could become an economic burden caused by housing, education cost, and other costs for childcare. Most women in developed countries are in the workforce and tend to have higher educations and professional careers. As a result, many women tend to have children late in life or no children at all.

According to the BBC, the total fertility rate in Taiwan had decreased to 0.9 children per woman in 2010. This figure is much lower than the replacement level and one of the lowest in the world. This indicates the population is experiencing negative growth and population aging is happening fast. According to a Central News Agency Report, total births in 2017 were below 200,000. Compared to previous decades, the total number of births since 2000 has been between 197,000 and 230,000. If this trend continues, the senior population in Taiwan will be almost 5 times higher than the youth population by 2060.

HIV/AIDS 

The first reported case of HIV/AIDS occurred in December 1984 and the first local infection was recorded in February 1986. As of May 2006, there were 11,486 recorded cases of HIV, of which 2,631 were confirmed with AIDS. There were 1,425 deaths, leaving 10,029 people living with HIV/AIDS. This is less than 0.05% of the total population of Taiwan. Statistics by the Center for Disease Control show that the gender distribution of infected persons was 90% male and 10% female.

Source: Center for Disease Control (CDC), Republic of China – May 2006 est.(PDF file)

Military personnel 

The Republic of China has a compulsory military draft for males aged 19–35 years of age with a service obligation of 12 months (2008).

Population available for draft 
Defined as 19–49 years of age.

Fit for military service 
Of the available population, the following are fit for military service. Defined as 19–49 years of age.

Education 

Taiwan has a nine-year compulsory education program initiated by the Ministry of Education in 1968. This consists of six years in elementary education and three years in junior high education. About 94.7% of junior high graduates continue their studies in either a senior high or vocational school . Reflecting a strong commitment to education, in FY 2001 16% of the ROC budget was allocated for education . The enrollment rate was 96.77% for the 2004–2005 school year. For the 2005–2006 school year, there were 5,283,855 students in both public and private schools, about a quarter of the entire population. The literacy rate is above 95%.

Since the mid-1990s, the government has introduced several education reforms in a bid to further improve education standards such as the replacement in 2002 of the 48-year-long Joint University Entrance Examination (JUEE; 大學聯考; Dàxué liánkǎo), which had been set up in 1954.

Distribution of students 

Source: Number of students at each level (SY 2005–2006), Ministry of Education, Republic of China.

Literacy 
The definition of literacy is those aged 15 and over who can read and write.

"International Comparison of Education Statistical Indicators – 2012 Edition", Ministry of Education, 2012. pp. 17. Retrieved on 2012-10-05. (Table 1-2-5. Literacy Rate for Age 15 Plus by Gender).

2.02 Population of 15 Years and Over by Educational Attainment , Statistical Yearbook of Interior, Ministry of the Interior, Republic of China (Taiwan). 2012. Retrieved on 10-05-2012.

Data source limitations 
The World Bank does not publish data on Taiwan in most of its online databases.

Notes

References

Bibliography

External links